National Lampoon, Inc. is a company formed in 2002 in order to use the brand name "National Lampoon" in comedy and entertainment following the tradition of its magazine predecessor, The National Lampoon. In the words of its prospectus, the role of the company was to "develop, produce, provide creative services and distribute National Lampoon branded comedic content through a broad range of media platforms." Since 2002, the company overhauled its corporate infrastructure several times.

In July 2017, PalmStar Media purchased all the assets of National Lampoon, Inc., including trademark and library of print, audio, film, and video content.

Properties of the company

National Lampoon Press

National Lampoon Inc releases humor books and material under the umbrella of National Lampoon Press. These include republished collections of old National Lampoon magazine material, including True Facts, Foto Funnies, cartoons etc. from the 1970s and 1980s.

Feature films

After its purchase by J2 Communications in 1991, the National Lampoon franchise became predominately a name-licensing company, in which the company was paid for use of its brand on titles such as National Lampoon's Van Wilder, National Lampoon's Senior Trip, Dorm Daze, Blackball, and Barely Legal.  Although this enterprise salvaged the company from bankruptcy, some believe it damaged the reputation of National Lampoon as a source of respected comedy.  When the company was purchased from J2 Communications, this practice was eventually discontinued.

In June 2007 National Lampoon Inc announced its intention to finance, produce and distribute its own feature films.  In an interview with the New York Times, Dan Laikin stated that "the company really had just been a licensing company in the ’90s.  We were just licensing the name and we had no creative input. When I came in, we had to re-energize the brand and cut back on the licensing, because the only way to take control of the brand was to make sure that ultimately we put it on projects that we are proud of." Eventually, the company hopes to release four of its own films annually and acquire up to eight more for distribution. The first released was Ratko: The Dictator's Son.

National Lampoon had also begun to purchase independent films and re-release them under the distinctive title of "National Lampoon Presents".  The first in this series was National Lampoon Presents The Beach Party at the Threshold of Hell, which was released in 2007.

Stage shows

In the fall of 2007, National Lampoon revived the live sketch comedy variety show, National Lampoon's Lemmings for a nationwide theatrical tour.  The show consists of a multimedia presentation of live sketches written and performed by the cast, which are integrated with related comedy videos.

In 2008, National Lampoon's Lemmings went into production with ManiaTV! on a half-hour web-based sketch comedy show. Notable cast members included Adam Devine, Blake Anderson, Kyle Newacheck and Anders Holm of Comedy Central's Workaholics fame, Jillian Bell, and Mark Gagliardi from Comedy Central's Drunk History and The Thrilling Adventure Hour. Both Lemmings and ManiaTV! have since been discontinued.

Podcast: The Final Edition

The Final Edition was a National Lampoon podcast from November 2015 to August 2019. The show was first created by former Lampoon editor Tony Hendra and author Jeff Kreisler, and was later primarily run by Barry Lank. As of the time of its separation from National Lampoon, the Final Edition has been getting downloaded more than 1,000 times per episode, putting it in the top 10 percent of podcasts, as measured by estimates from Rob Walch, VP of Podcaster Relations at Libsyn. It ceased production in March 2020, with the onset of the COVID-19 pandemic.

Comedy album

Lampoon issued "Are There Any Triggers Here Tonight" in 2016, using material from its Final Edition podcast. It was the first Lampoon album in 35 years.

National Lampoon.com and the web

The company's website, NationalLampoon.com, has been awarded "Best of the Web" from The Los Angeles Times, Forbes, USA Today, CNN and The Wall Street Journal, and was twice nominated by the Webby Awards for "Best Humor Site" in 2001 and 2005. In 2002, the content of National Lampoon.com was officially registered into the Smithsonian Institution for best exemplifying American satire in the weeks following the September 11 attacks. The website currently emphasizes original video content, both in-house and freelance, spread to viral video hosting sites such as YouTube.

In addition to the content created by The National Lampoon staff, The National Lampoon Humor Network is an affiliation of almost fifty comedy websites owned or partnered with National Lampoon. Collectively, they drew approximately 5 million monthly viewers in May 2007. This format has given it a consistent Comscore rating of #1 amongst comedy websites, barely beating out Comedy Central's web presence at #2.

During 2011, the website was redesigned to resemble the classic National Lampoon magazine format. Staff writers and contributors included comedians Sandy Danto, Jessica Gottlieb, Phil Haney, Aaron Waltke, Seth Herzog, Evan Kessler, Kevin McCaffrey, Nadine Rajabi, Garrett Hargrove, Travis Tack, Eddie Rawls, and Matt Zaller .

Publishing daily satire and cartoons, as of 2017 National Lampoon online is helmed by Editor-in-Chief Marty Dundics with contributing writers and artists including New Yorker cartoonist Bob Eckstein, SNL humorist Jack Handey, author Mike Sacks, MAD Magazines' Kit Lively, Paul Lander, Jon Daly, Dan Wuori, Brooke Preston, Trump satirist Johnny Wright and Playboy playmate/Huffington Post columnist Juliette Fretté. National Lampoon is very active on Twitter, initiating hashtag games that produce trending topics.  According to their social media accounts on Facebook, Twitter and Instagram they are 'The Comedy Brand.' iHeart Radio is a content partner with National Lampoon Comedy Radio featuring National Lampoon Radio News.  There is a comedy store that sells branded T-shirts and all of the back issues of the original magazine.

Radio

National Lampoon Comedy Radio was a 24/7 all comedy radio network that was made available to XM Satellite Radio, AM, FM, HD, Cable Radio and Podcast. It ran for two and a half years.

Affiliated with Clear Channel Communications, National Lampoon Comedy Radio was first added to XM Satellite Radio, and began airing on the satellite radio service on October 1, 2006. Much of the programming was broadcast from National Lampoon World Headquarters in West Hollywood, California. The station had pre-recorded, mock-live comedy talk shows with hosts Nadine Rajabi "Nadine @ Nite", Kevin Couch, and Phil Iazzetta broadcasting five days a week. The programing was built around stand-up performances from famous comedians such as Jerry Seinfeld, Robin Williams, George Carlin, D. L. Hughley, and Bob Saget. The station also played prank calls from Crank Yankers and other sources, parody songs (labeled "Poon Tunes"), and interviews with active comedians (Marc Maron, Larry The Cable Guy, Dave Attell, and many more).

Behind the scenes, the XM network was created and run out of two small, adjoining offices in a building on Sunset Blvd.  The programing, while seeming live to the listener, was pre-recorded and uploaded to an XM server each day.

While on the air, the station was funded by Kent Emmons and supported by a staff of Tre Giles, David Frederic, Eugene Chin, Kevin Couch, Phil Iazzetta, Nadine Rajabi, Eric Cahill, and Jason Sharp.

Funding for the network was pulled in May 2008, when it was deemed unprofitable (despite having not employed anyone to sell ads).  The XM feed continued to air existing content until the following year.

As of March 6, 2009, National Lampoon radio was dropped from the Sirius-XM line-up, replaced by talk programming.

Television

Originally formed in 2002, the National Lampoon College Network was a block of weekly television programming broadcast to colleges and universities. The format was similar to MTVu, the college-focused division of MTV.

Other media
 National Lampoon's Strip Poker Released on pay-per-view in 2005 after being filmed at the Hedonism II nudist resort in Negril, Jamaica.  The one-hour episodes featured various Playboy, WWE, and pin-up models competing in strip poker match-ups.
 National Lampoon's Knucklehead Video A video-sharing and social networking site featuring viral video content of extreme sports bloopers, "drunken debauchery" and the self-explanatory 'show us your butts'.
 National Lampoon's Eye for an Eye A syndicated television program that provides a variation on popular thirty-minute courtroom reality shows.
 National Lampoon's Chess Maniac 5 Billion and 1 A video game from the early 1990s for the PC platform.  It was a 3-D chess game with animated battle scenes between the pieces when you attacked another piece, in the style of Battle Chess.

The GSN cable television network in 2003 produced a comedy game show National Lampoon's Funny Money, hosted by Jimmy Pardo.  The game featured guest comedians and the more laughs in the "funny zone" were registered, the more points were earned.  The winner went on to play for a National Lampoon vacation.

2008 and 2009 prosecutions
In December 2008, federal prosecutors in Philadelphia filed charges against Daniel Laikin, the former CEO of National Lampoon Incorporated, with accusations that he and two third-party stock promoters attempted to artificially inflate the company's stock price. Daniel Laikin pleaded guilty on September 23, 2009 to his role in a conspiracy to manipulate the company's stock price from March through June 2008. In September 2010, a Philadelphia court sentenced Laikin to 45 months in prison.

After Laikin resigned from his position as CEO, shareholder Tim Durham took over duties as CEO of National Lampoon Incorporated. However the next year Tim Durham was involved in a major Ponzi scheme for which he was sentenced to 50 years in prison.

References

External links
 [https://www.nytimes.com/2005/07/03/arts/03tapp.html?pagewanted=1&ei=5090&en=7912f064b27caa5b&ex=1278043200&partner=rssuserland&emc=rss "National Lampoon Grows Up By Dumbing Down] by Jake Tapper, The New York Times, July 3, 2005.
National Lampoon's Knucklehead Video
National Lampoon's Strip Poker
National Lampoon Comedy Radio
National Lampoon'''s Former Creative Staff of Steve Brykman, Joe Oesterle, Sean Crespo, and Mason Brown sell themselves on Ebay after being laid off]
[https://www.nytimes.com/2005/07/03/arts/03tapp.html?pagewanted=1&ei=5090&en=7912f064b27caa5b&ex=1278043200&partner=rssuserland&emc=rss "National Lampoon Grows Up By Dumbing Down by Jake Tapper, The New York Times'', July 3, 2005.
List of National Lampoon movies

2002 establishments in California
American companies established in 2002
Companies based in Los Angeles County, California
Film production companies of the United States
Mass media companies established in 2002
 National Lampoon, Incorporated
West Hollywood, California